Horseshoe Casino Tunica is a casino resort located in Tunica Resorts, Mississippi. It was developed by Jack Binion, the son of Las Vegas gaming legend Benny Binion, and named after his father's famous Binion's Horseshoe downtown gambling hall. Much like its namesake, the Horseshoe Tunica is known for catering to serious gamblers, particularly table games players, and is known for its liberal, player-favorable rules and its comp policies.

The Tunica "Shoe" was opened in 1995 as part of "Casino Center," a development by Jack Binion with three casinos side by side [Circus Circus Tunica (now Gold Strike Resort and Casino) and Sheraton Casino and Hotel (later Tunica Roadhouse Casino & Hotel, now razed) being the neighbors]. The property has undergone several expansions and renovations over the years.

Binion sold Horseshoe Gaming Holding Corporation, the Tunica property's corporate parent, to Harrah's Entertainment in 2004. Under Harrah's, the Tunica "Shoe" became home to a World Series of Poker circuit event; previously, the Horseshoe had partnered with the neighboring Gold Strike to host the Jack Binion World Poker Open, a stop on the World Poker Tour.  Harrah's Entertainment renamed itself to Caesars Entertainment in 2010.

In October 2017, ownership of the property was transferred to Vici Properties as part of a corporate spin-off, and it was leased back to Caesars Entertainment.

The casino features more than 70 table games, more than 2,000 slot machines, a large poker room, three fine-dining restaurants, a large buffet and a snack bar. The hotel features more than 500 rooms, most configured as suites. The main showroom, the "Bluesville Showcase Nightclub" opened in 1998 and seats 1,400.

See also  
List of Caesars Entertainment properties
List of casinos in Mississippi

References

External links
Horseshoe Casino Tunica web site

1995 establishments in Mississippi
Casinos completed in 1995
Hotel buildings completed in 1995
Hotels established in 1995
1995 ships
Riverboat casinos
Caesars Entertainment
Casinos in Tunica County, Mississippi
Casino hotels